Tricky Dicky may refer to one of the following:
US President Richard Nixon, as a derogatory nickname with origins in the 1950 United States Senate election in California (also "Tricky Dick")
 A song about Richard Nixon by Country Joe McDonald
"Tricky Dicky", a 1962 song by Jerry Leiber and Mike Stoller, recorded by Richie Barrett and The Searchers among others
Tricky Dicky (Cor!), a British comic strip by Cyril Gwyn Price, which appeared in the magazine Cor!! from 1970 to 1973
Tricky Dicky (Topper), a British comic strip by John Dalles which appeared in the magazine The Topper and The Beano, from 1977 on
Richard Hillman, in the Coronation Street TV series
Richard Cole (EastEnders), in the EastEnders TV series
Tricky Dicky's Mission Impossible, a character from the children's television show, ZZZap!
Man Called Invincible, a 1973 western comedy film also known as Tricky Dicky

See also
"Tricky Dick", the 3rd episode of the 3rd season of the sitcom 3rd Rock from the Sun
Tricky Dicks, starring American slapstick comedy team The Three Stooges
Tricky Nixon, a band from Manchester, England

Nicknames of politicians